Rainer Kussmaul (3 June 1946 – 27 March 2017) was a German Grammy Award-winning violinist and conductor. Kussmaul was born in Mannheim and studied at the State Academy of Fine Arts Stuttgart. He was professor in Freiburg, first concertmaster of the Berlin Philharmonic and led the Berliner Barocksolisten. He died in Freiburg at age 70.

Awards
 2010 Order of Merit of the Federal Republic of Germany

References

German violinists
1946 births
2017 deaths
Recipients of the Cross of the Order of Merit of the Federal Republic of Germany